No Place Like Home is a BBC situation comedy series, created, and written by Jon Watkins. It was directed, produced by Robin Nash, starring William Gaunt and Patricia Garwood as Arthur and Beryl Crabtree. Arthur has a brand new life planned with Beryl now that the last of their four children have left home, or so he believes.

No Place Like Home was broadcast for five series between 1983 and 1987. Technically, six series were made, but  series 3 (7 episodes), which was intended for broadcast in 1985, was subsequently aired from January 1986, back to back with series 4 (6 episodes). This resulted in both of these series merging to become an extended series 3, with 13 episodes, ending in April 1986.

Later in October 1986, a new series 4 of seven  episodes aired, and a final fifth series of 8 episodes was broadcast in 1987. The sitcom featured the first regular roles on television for Martin Clunes and Marcia Warren.

Plot
"...Arthur and Beryl Crabtree had raised four children and looked forward to the day when their time once again would be their own; a second honeymoon was planned as the last of their offspring finally left home. However, their hopes were soon dashed as one by one the fledglings returned to the nest disillusioned with life in the outside world. For the children there was no place like home. The eldest of the children was Lorraine (Beverley Adams) who had married traffic warden Raymond Codd (Daniel Hill) but cast him aside in the final series. Raymond is replaced by a similar character, Roger Duff (Roger Martin), in Lorraine's affections. There was also Nigel, a veterinary student, Paul and Tracey (and their assorted girlfriends and boyfriends), while the Crabtrees' domestic bliss was also disturbed by their nosey neighbours the Bottings, particularly the shrieking, animal-loving Vera. Arthur, and Vera's husband Trevor, often escaped to the greenhouse when things became unbearable, seeking solace in a glass of home-made sherry...."

Cast

Recasting 

Like several comedies from the 1980s and 90s (Bread, Goodnight Sweetheart, and May to December are good examples), the last two series suffered from recasts and popular  characters disappearing without explanation. Both Marcia Warren and Martin Clunes, who both played arguably the series most popular characters, left at the end of the extended season 3 in 1986. Clunes' character, Nigel Crabtree, was immediately recast with Andrew Charleson taking over the part. Warren's character, the potty animal lover, Vera Botting, was rested for series 4, but returned in series 5, played by Ann Penfold.

The eldest Crabtree son, Paul, last appeared during series 4 and the character was not recast due to the death of actor Stephen Watson on his honeymoon during the filming of series 4.

Ratings 
There's a popular myth that the recasting of characters led to the decline in popularity of the series. This isn't actually true: in actual fact, the final two series both had higher ratings than the third.

During the first two years the ratings published for television were in the form of "Top 10 per channel", with only one episode (2.6) reaching the BBC1 Top 10 with 9.95 million viewers. The ratings for the remaining three series were as follows:

DVD releases
The first two series of No Place Like Home were released in 2006.

References

 The Penguin TV Companion by Jeff Evans

External links
 
 No Place Like Home at the BBC Comedy Guide

1980s British sitcoms
1983 British television series debuts
1987 British television series endings
BBC television sitcoms
English-language television shows